In Mitra Medusa Inri (IMMI) is a German dark wave band formed in 1992, characterized by a blend of melancholic vocals and electro atmospheric gothic-wave.

History
In 1992, when wave was believed to be dead, In Mitra Medusa Inri was founded. With the intention to convert their events and emotions into music, Volker and Holger started their musical work and Michael joined soon. Only a short time later, they signed their first record deal at Spirit Productions. Very soon various concerts, for example at Zwischenfall ( D-Bochum ) and Kassablanca ( D-Jena ) followed. The reaction of the audience was positive without exception and so the band became famous in the scene. Due to internal problems in 1995 IN MITRA MEDUSA INRI firstly was winded up for a while.

1996

Because a lot of fans demanded Mozart (Spirit Productions) about IMMI and the reason of their musical pause, they made the purpose to the original members of the band to publish a CD. After intensive talks which should eliminate the known problems they decided to restart.
The CD Long forgotten world was produced and sold about 2.000 units. Fans from Italy, Poland, Switzerland and Germany got in touch with the band. Unfortunately, the problems which caused the first cut came up again. Holger and Michael separated from their singer Volker in order to go choose new ways.

1998

Holger and Michael concentrated on organising concerts for a club. Wishing to compose further songs and to take opportunity of the creative output they founded MY PERSONAL COUNTDOWN just a little later. This new project should start at the point where IN MITRA MEDUSA INRI collapsed.
After Volker had published a second CD under the name of IN MITRA MEDUSA INRI in the meantime, his band collapsed definitely. Without further ado Holger and Michael decided to operate again as IN MITRA MEDUSA INRI. The clear statement is: "This band is an important part of our life." The two create new old sounds with the following message: Close your eyes and let yourself fall.

2003

With their actual longplayer Darkness between us (release November 2003, Apollyon) IN MITRA MEDUSA INRI created a world of melancholy, longing and also critical impressions. Far from cliché it offers an individual sound. Ten tracks melting to a work of art, carried by a warm voice and wistful guitars. A collection of emotions coupled with love for details which has the intention to take the listener on a journey to his inner mind. Style: JOY DIVISION meets NEW ORDER meets THE CURE. Darkness between us is a soulfood-album which invites to undiscovered sphere - the masterpiece of IN MITRA MEDUSA INRI so far. Produced by O.Müller ( S.I.T.D. - Cyber Axis - Megadump )

The name
IN MITRA MEDUSA INRI - a name of phantasy - if you want, a number of expressions. It has, however, a deeper sense, although - or even because - the members of the band, realize and express the meaning of their music in their very own way.

In Greek legends, MEDUSA is described as a female monster/god, whose look lets everything become stone. With their music the band hopes to receive a similar penetrate effect at their listeners.

In form of fish's head MITRA originally symbolized the hat of god Dagon. It counts as a sign of friendship. We, IN MITRA MEDUSA INRI (IMMI) are friends, not just a few people who joined in order to make music. Common ways through ups and downs unite them so that the original meaning of "Mitra" has characterising meaning for the guys.

INRI is the abbreviation for Christian religion (as well as inscription of the cross: Iesus Nazarenus Rex Iudaeorum, in English: Jesus of Nazareth, king of Jews) - religion need not be a given schema but may be everything - a song, a poem, a feeling.

Discography
 Long Forgotten World (1996)
 Commedia Del Arte (1998)
 In Mitra Medusa Inri MCD (2001)
 Dreams (2002)
 Darkness Between Us (2003)
 Without a View of Things (2005)
 Kalte Farben (2007)
 Lucid (2014)

Members
 Volker (1992–1999 and 2010) - Vocals,Guitar
Michael (1992–2007) – Second Vocals, Guitar, Bass,  synthesizers, samplers and programming
 Holger (1992–present) –  Vocals, synthesizers, samplers and programming
Dan Barky ( 2010–present) Keys, samples, programming, mixing, masterering, soundengenier
Sandra (2011–present) Guitar
Lagrey (2010–present) Pics, Videos, Web and other brain´s

External links

Official site
Myspace
https://www.facebook.com/pages/IN-MITRA-MEDUSA-INRI/252644698092765?ref=hl
https://www.youtube.com/user/inmitramedusainri/videos
https://soundcloud.com/holger-meyer

German dark wave musical groups